William Henry Bullock (April 13, 1927 – April 3, 2011) was an American prelate of the Roman Catholic Church who served as bishop of the Diocese of Madison in Wisconsin from 1993 to 2003.

Bullock previously served as an auxiliary bishop of the Archdiocese of Saint Paul and Minneapolis in Minnesota from 1980 to 1987 and as bishop of the Diocese of Des Moines in Iowa from 1987 to 1993.

Biography

Early life and education
William Bullock was born on April 13, 1927, in Maple Lake, Minnesota. He attended Saint Paul Seminary in St. Paul, Minnesota, in preparation for the priesthood.

Bullock was ordained a priest by Archbishop John Murray on June 7, 1952, for the Archdiocese of Saint Paul and Minneapolis.  He taught religion for several years and served as headmaster at Saint Thomas Military Academy, an archdiocesan high school in Mendota Heights, Minnesota.  He held a pastoral position at Saint John the Baptist Parish in Excelsior, Minnesota from 1971 to 1980.

Auxiliary Bishop of Saint Paul and Minneapolis
Bullock was appointed as an auxiliary bishop of the Archdiocese of Saint Paul and Minneapolis and titular bishop of Natchesium on June 3, 1980, by Pope John Paul II. He was consecrated in St. Paul, Minnesota, on August 12, 1980, by Archbishop John Roach.

Bishop of Des Moines

On February 10, 1987, Bullock was appointed bishop of the Diocese of Des Moines by John Paul II, succeeding Maurice John Dingman. He was installed on April 2, 1987.

Bishop of Madison, Wisconsin

On April 13, 1993, John Paul II appointed Bullock as the third bishop of the Diocese of Madison; he was installed on June 14, 1993.  In 1995, Bullock made the controversial decision to close Holy Name Seminary, a private boys high school in Madison, Wisconsin. 

On May 23, 2003, John Paul II accepted Bullock's resignation as bishop of Madison. William Bullock died on April 3, 2000, of lung cancer in Madison.

See also

 Catholic Church hierarchy
 Catholic Church in the United States
 Historical list of the Catholic bishops of the United States
 List of Catholic bishops of the United States
 Lists of patriarchs, archbishops, and bishops

References

External links
 Roman Catholic Archdiocese of Saint Paul and Minneapolis
 Roman Catholic Diocese of Des Moines
 Roman Catholic Diocese of Madison 

1927 births
2011 deaths
Deaths from lung cancer
Deaths from cancer in Wisconsin
20th-century Roman Catholic bishops in the United States
21st-century Roman Catholic bishops in the United States
University of St. Thomas (Minnesota) alumni
People from Maple Lake, Minnesota
Catholic Church in Minnesota
Religious leaders from Minnesota
Roman Catholic Archdiocese of Saint Paul and Minneapolis
Roman Catholic bishops of Des Moines
Roman Catholic bishops of Madison
Catholics from Minnesota